|}

The Prix Maurice Gillois is a Group 1 steeplechase in France which is open to four-year-old horses. It is run at Auteuil over a distance of 4,400 metres (about 2 miles and 6 furlongs), and it is scheduled to take place each year in November.  It is the championship race for four-year-old steeplechasers in France, and is also known as the Grand Steeple-Chase des Quatre Ans.

Winners

See also
 List of French jump horse races

References 
France Galop / Racing Post: 
 galopp-sieger.de – Prix Maurice Gillois Grand Steeple-Chase Des 4 Ans

Steeplechase (horse racing)
Horse races in France